Bootle New Strand railway station is a railway station in the centre of Bootle,   Merseyside, England. It is on the Northern Line of the Merseyrail network and serves in particular the nearby New Strand Shopping Centre.  The platforms are elevated and are reached by ramps from the entrance at street level.  Connecting bus services leave from the nearby bus station in the basement of New Strand Shopping Centre.

History
Bootle New Strand opened in 1850 as an intermediate station when the Liverpool, Crosby and Southport Railway was extended from its previous terminal at Waterloo to Liverpool Exchange. Originally it was named Marsh Lane & Strand Road, until 1968 when the nearby New Strand Shopping Centre was built. The LC&SR became part of the Lancashire and Yorkshire Railway (LYR), on 14 June 1855. The Lancashire and Yorkshire Railway amalgamated with the London and North Western Railway on 1 January 1922 and in turn was Grouped into the London, Midland and Scottish Railway in 1923. Nationalisation followed in 1948 and in 1978 the station became part of the Merseyrail network's Northern Line (operated by British Rail until privatisation in 1995).

Facilities
The station has a ticket office and is staffed, during all opening hours, and has platform CCTV. There is step-free access to both platforms provided by 30 metre long ramps. There are cycle racks for 10 cycles and secure cycle storage for 32 cycles. There is a newsagents in the main building and a public telephone on platform 1.  Service running information is available via CIS screens, automated announcements, customer help points and timetable poster boards.

Services
Trains operate every 15 minutes throughout the day from Monday to Saturday and on summer Sundays to Southport to the north, and to Hunts Cross via Liverpool Central to the south. Winter Sunday services are every 30 minutes in each direction.

Gallery

References

External links

Railway stations in the Metropolitan Borough of Sefton
DfT Category E stations
Former Lancashire and Yorkshire Railway stations
Railway stations served by Merseyrail
Bootle
Railway stations in Great Britain opened in 1850